The Peugeot Type 68 is an early motor car that the French auto-maker Peugeot produced at their Audincourt plant during 1905.  276 were produced.

Three different version of the Type 68 were listed. A single-cylinder 883 cc four-stroke engine, mounted ahead of the driver, propelled the Type 68A and Type 68B. The rear wheels received a maximum of 8 hp via a rotating drive-shaft.  The Type 68C was similarly powered except that the single-cylinder engine had a capacity of 987 cc.

The car had a  wheelbase.   The open carriage Tonneau format body offered space for four as did the covered carriage format Phaeton / Torpedo bodied version.   In retrospect the car can be seen as Peugeot’s first Torpedo bodied car, although the classification is anachronistic since the term “Torpedo” to describe a car body was coined only in 1908.   Buyers opting for the larger engined Type 68C had the chance to specify a racing car body.

Sources and further reading 
 Wolfgang Schmarbeck: Alle Peugeot Automobile 1890-1990. Motorbuch-Verlag. Stuttgart 1990. 

Type 68
Cars introduced in 1905
Brass Era vehicles